Blind Faith is the debut record by British rock band Walk on Fire.  It was released in 1989 on MCA and featured production by Walter Turbitt, who was known for his work with The Cars.  It had two minor hits, the title track and "Wastelands" and also features a song co-written by Trevor Rabin, who was knee-deep in his career with Yes.

After the album's release, the band toured extensively with Foreigner, The Dan Reed Network, RATT and Nils Lofgren, but commercial success eluded them (despite favorable reviews) and the band were dropped by MCA.

Since then a second album by Walk on Fire entitled Mind Over Matter was released April 2017 on Escape Music Ltd.

Track listing
"Blind Faith" (Dave Cairns) – 4:44
"Wastelands" (Cairns) – 4:40
"Crime Of Loving You" (Cairns) – 4:13
"Tell It Like It Is" (Cairns, Alan King, Dennis Smith) – 4:14
"Caledonia" (King) – 4:36
"Hearts Of Gold" (Cairns) – 5:03
"Hands Of Time" (Cairns) – 4:52
"Hungry For Heaven" (Cairns) – 4:01
"Miracle Of Life" (Cairns) – 4:45
"Close My Eyes" (Cairns) – 4:55

Notes
The song "Miracle Of Life" and "Wastlelands" were written solely by David Cairns (as the album credits and PRS confirm) and does not feature co-writing credits from Mark Mancina and Trevor Rabin (then guitarist for wildly popular band Yes).  Mancina and Rabin also co-wrote a track of the same name for Yes's album Union.  Oddly enough, the title(s) are merely coincidental, as the two songs are nothing alike.

Personnel

Walk on Fire
Alan King: Vocals
Mike Casswell: Acoustic & electric guitars
Dave Cairns: Keyboards, additional acoustic & electric guitars
Phil Williams: Bass, backing vocals
John Henderson: Drums

Additional personnel
Keith Airey: Guitars
Richard Cottle, Tim Moore, Peter Vitesse: Keyboards
Graham Edwards: Bass
Steve Ferrone: Drums, Percussion
Andy Caine, Gary Dyson, Scott Gilman, "The Faithettes": Backing Vocals

Production
Produced By Walter Turbitt
Recorded & Engineered By Peter Jones & Walter Turbitt
Assistant Engineer: Mark Wessel
Mastered By Greg Calbi

External links
[ "Blind Faith" at allmusic; track listing, songwriters and lengths]
[ "Blind Faith" at allmusic; personnel listing]

1989 debut albums
MCA Records albums